James Massey (1934–2013) was an information theorist.

James or Jimmy Massey is also the name of:

 Jimmy Massey (1929–2015), NASCAR driver
 Jimmy Massey (footballer) (1869–1960), English football player